James Likoudis (December 11, 1928) is an American Roman Catholic theologian, author and former lecturer in religious studies.

Career 
In 1977 Likoudis's translation of Renée Casin's St. Thomas Aquinas: Orthodoxy, and Neo-Modernism in the Church from French to English was published. He has also authored several books dealing with sex education, the Eastern Orthodox Church and its teachings, liturgical issues and controversies following the Second Vatican Council, and articles and commentary about prominent Roman Catholics. He is the president emeritus of the Catholic lay organization Catholics United for the Faith (CUF) and the founder of Credo of Buffalo. 

While working with CUF, Likoudis led the charge to remove ecclesiastical approval from the theologically problematic "Christ Among Us" Catechism, a campaign that was eventually heard by the Vatican's CDF head, Cardinal Ratzinger (later Pope Benedict XVI), which took action to remove the Imprimatur and Nihil Obstat before eventually requesting that Paulist Press cease further production and sales of the book. Similarly, Likoudis played a prominent role in bringing to the Vatican's awareness the dissent and theological error being taught at CUA by Fr. Charles Curran. After many years and many more reports, Fr. Curran was removed from his teaching position by the Church hierarchy.

Mr. Likoudis is also the former president of Morality in Media, an organization now known as The National Center on Sexual Exploitation - an organization that campaigns against pornography, sex education and sex trafficking. The organization describes its goal as "exposing the links between all forms of sexual exploitation". In its beginnings, the organization was primarily Catholic. He is also the former moderator of the New York TV series "Sex and Morality." 

Another significant contribution of Likoudis is his work with the late Dietrich von Hildebrand and his wife Alice von Hildebrand in their work on sex education, through working with, and acting as board member of the organization, Veil of Innocence, and also contributing to the published work of Dietrich's: “Sex Education: The Basic Issues and Related Essays” which contains a personally penned recommendation from Saint Mother Teresa of Calcutta.

He also helped to found the late Father John Hardon S.J.s organization, Eternal Life, as well as contributing to some of Father Hardon's books, most notably, penning the foreword to the published dissertation of Fr. Hardon which he completed at the Gregorian in Rome on the topic of "Bellarmine's Doctrine of the Relation of Sincere Non-Catholics to the Catholic Church".

A convert to Roman Catholicism in 1952 from Eastern Orthodoxy, the Christian faith into which he was baptized, Likoudis has since devoted a great deal of his apologetical and polemical efforts to foster reunion and submission of the Eastern Orthodox Churches to the See of Rome and the Papacy. In his essay, To be Truly Orthodox is to be in Communion with Peter's See (1988), Likoudis gives an account of his personal journey from Greek Byzantine Rite Orthodoxy to Latin Rite Roman Catholicism.

Likoudis' book Ending the Byzantine Greek Schism (2nd revised edition, 1992) aims to answer historical criticisms as well as theological objections raised by apologists for Orthodox Christianity.

In Likoudis's The Divine Primacy of the Bishop of Rome and Modern Eastern Orthodoxy: Letters to a Greek Orthodox on the Unity of the Church, he refutes the objections of Orthodox and Protestant critics to modern Roman Papal claims. An earlier edition of this book – The Divine Primacy of the Bishop of Rome, Reply to a Former Catholic – was written particularly to refute Eastern Orthodox writer, Michael Whelton's arguments, put forth in his book, Two Paths.

His last book in the trilogy is Eastern Orthodoxy and the See of Peter in which he outlines some current controversies, as well as identifies pathways forward for reconciliation of both sides and shows a portrait of a saint who devoted his life to this ecumenical endeavor and modeled it in his personal life.

His latest book is Heralds to a Catholic Russia – Twelve Spiritual Pilgrims, from Byzantium to Rome. This book contains portraits of saints, philosophers, and royalty, who all found their way from Orthodoxy to Catholicism through intellectual engagement with the arguments for and against Catholicism. The book ends with a pertinent section on Our Lady of Fátima's apparitions and messages and their relevance to a future, hoped-for Catholic Russia.

Likoudis co-authored The Pope, the Council and the Mass (Christopher Publishing House, 1981 and 1982; Rev. Ed. Emmaus Road Publishing, 2006), a defense of Pope Paul VI's Ordo Missae and the liturgical reforms envisaged by Vatican II. L'Osservatore Romano noted in 1981, "This book has been sorely needed for well over a decade."

Likoudis has lectured extensively on issues affecting education, family life, and the role of the laity in the Roman Catholic Church. He has also written for The Wanderer (see below). Additionally, he is a contributing author to the Encyclopedia of Catholic Social Thought, Social Science and Social Policy as well as the widely acclaimed Faith and Life children's catechetical series published by Catholics United for the Faith which is used as a primary resource in many Catholic Schools.  

He has appeared on numerous shows including EWTN's Journey Home network, the Mother Angelica show, the Geraldo Show, the Phil Donahue show, and most recently, the Reason and Theology show.
He has been a part of conferences hosted by and with the Franciscan University of Steubenville, Dr. Robert Fastiggi, and Mother Angelica, among others. 

In 2020, Likoudis received an honorary doctorate from Detroit's Sacred Heart Major Seminary for his work in Catholic apologetics, catechetics, ecumenism, and Catholic – Eastern Orthodox relations. He is a member of Aleteia's Board of Experts, a former member of the Fellowship of Catholic Scholars and the Society of Catholic Social Scientists, and has worked as a consultant for Catholic Answers’ apologetics website.

Awards 
In 1957 Likoudis received a Summer Scholarship in Middle East Studies from the University of Rochester.

He is the 1968 Harvest Yearbook Dedication Recipient for his philosophy of life, and inspirational approach to critical thinking.

In 1973 he received the Morality in Media award.

He is listed in the American Catholic Who's Who: Bicentennial edition.

In 2002, he received the Blessed Frederick Ozanam Award for Catholic Social Action, which was presented at the October 18, 2002, annual meeting of the Society for Catholic Social Scientists.

December 2020, Mr. Likoudis had conferred on him by Sacred Heart Major Seminary an honorary Doctor of Divinity degree.

Personal life

James Likoudis is married to Ruth Hickleton who together have six children: Therese, Paul (in memoriam), Mark, Celine, Cathy and Margaret. They have 35 grandchildren and 29 great grandchildren.

James and his wife currently reside in Ann Arbor, Michigan.

Articles 

A small sampling of his essays can be found below. However, Dr. Likoudis has authored close over 200 additional essays. He also has an extensive list of books he has contributed to, in addition to the books he’s written personally. 

Many of his essays can be found on his website.

Works

A Grievous Distortion of the Catechism of the Catholic Church (Serviam newsletter, May/June 1993, April 1994)
A Modern Dissenter's Theology of Sexuality: Moral Theologian Richard C. Sparks, CSP (Social Justice Review, May/June 2001)
Abortion And Limbo (The Wanderer)
Countering the Eclipse of Sin in Marriage Preparation (The Wanderer, May 25, 2006)
Eastern Orthodoxy: Primacy and Reunion (The American Ecclesiastical Review, February 1966)
Fr. William J. Bausch: His Chickens Come Home to Roost (The Wanderer, August 25, 2005)
Honored or Ignored?: Truth and Meaning of Human Sexuality: Guidelines for Education Within The Family (Sex Education: The Basic Issues and Related Essays, January 31, 2001)
Is 'Together for Life' Faithful to Magisterial Teaching on Contraception? (1990)
The Marks Of The Church And Eastern Orthodoxy (Homiletic & Pastoral Review, March 2003)
Msgr. Joseph M. Champlin as Liturgist (The Wanderer, December 28, 2006)
On Monika the Modernist (Serviam newsletter, February – March 1994)
The Catholic-Orthodox Dialogue: Light and Shadows (The Wanderer, February 3, 2005)
The 'Church of the East' Sheds Light on the Roman Primacy (The Wanderer, September 21, 2006)
The Modernized Jesus of the RENEW "Process" (The Christian Order, May 1986)
The Pentecostalism Controversy (September 11, 1973)
The Theology of Sexuality of a Modern Dissenter: Rev. Richard C. Sparks, CSP (May 1996)
Trivialising Christ Our Lord (The Christian Order, May 1988)
What They Are Saying about Mary to Destroy the Faith of Catholics (Serviam newsletter, CREDO, Buffalo, New York)
What to Think of "Small Faith Communities" (CUF News, May/June/July 1996)
Yet More on Monika the Modernist (The Wanderer, June 23, 1994)

References

External links 
 Official website

1928 births
American Roman Catholic religious writers
American traditionalist Catholics
American people of Greek descent
Converts to Roman Catholicism from Eastern Orthodoxy
Former American Orthodox Christians
Writers from Buffalo, New York
Roman Catholic activists
Living people